Bill Barton may refer to:

 Bill Barton (footballer) (born 1936), Australian rules footballer
 William T. Barton (born 1933), member of the Utah State Senate